In statistics, a parametric model or parametric family or finite-dimensional model is a particular class of statistical models. Specifically, a parametric model is a family of probability distributions that has a finite number of parameters.

Definition

  
A statistical model is a collection of probability distributions on some sample space. We assume that the collection, is indexed by some set . The set  is called the parameter set or, more commonly, the parameter space. For each , let  denote the corresponding member of the collection; so  is a cumulative distribution function. Then a statistical model can be written as  
 

The model is a parametric model if  for some positive integer .

When the model consists of absolutely continuous distributions, it is often specified in terms of corresponding probability density functions:

Examples
 The Poisson family of distributions is parametrized by a single number :
 
where  is the probability mass function. This family is an exponential family.

 
This parametrized family is both an exponential family and a location-scale family.

 The Weibull translation model has a three-dimensional parameter :
 

 
This example illustrates the definition for a model with some discrete parameters.

General remarks
A parametric model is called identifiable if the mapping  is invertible, i.e. there are no two different parameter values  and  such that .

Comparisons with other classes of models
Parametric models are contrasted with the semi-parametric, semi-nonparametric, and non-parametric models, all of which consist of an infinite set of "parameters" for description. The distinction between these four classes is as follows:
 in a "parametric" model all the parameters are in finite-dimensional parameter spaces;
 a model is "non-parametric" if all the parameters are in infinite-dimensional parameter spaces;
 a "semi-parametric" model contains finite-dimensional parameters of interest and infinite-dimensional nuisance parameters;
 a "semi-nonparametric" model has both finite-dimensional and infinite-dimensional unknown parameters of interest.

Some statisticians believe that the concepts "parametric", "non-parametric", and "semi-parametric" are ambiguous. It can also be noted that the set of all probability measures has cardinality of continuum, and therefore it is possible to parametrize any model at all by a single number in (0,1) interval. This difficulty can be avoided by considering only "smooth" parametric models.

See also
 Parametric family
 Parametric statistics
 Statistical model
 Statistical model specification

Notes

Bibliography

 
 
 
 
 
 
 

Parametric statistics
Statistical models